The Adventures of Sinbad  is a 2D animated movie featuring Sinbad the sailor and his friends. Produced by Afzal Ahmed Khan and directed by duo Shinjan Neogi and Abhishek Panchal; this animated movie released on 22 March 2013.

Synopsis
The Adventures of Sinbad is a 2D animated movie about Sinbad (a 12-year-old boy) and his friends. The little sailor of legend is framed by the King of darkness  Sahzaman for the treasure of seven seas, and must travel to his realm at the end of the world to retrieve it and save the life of King Nazab (the king of the city of Baghdad), who is also father of princess Xina. The extremely adventures voyage for the hunt  of the greatest treasure witness the most terrifying dark evil power of Sahzaman and the fights of our sailor of legend Sinbad and his friends.

Cast
 Vaibhav as Sinbad 
 Manju as Xina 
 Jeet as Qasim 
 Sunil Tiwari as Sahzamaan 
 Vandana as Saara
 Yogesh as King Nazab 
 Saakshi as Heera

Production
The Adventures of Sinbad has been in the making for the last 18 months. Since it is an animated movie, the makers have taken extra care to make sure that everyone irrespective of their age enjoys this movie with the use of latest technology & innovative creativity through story-telling. This movie is made under the banner of Lodi Films Pvt. Ltd. and will be distributed by PVR Directors Rare.

See also
List of indian animated feature films

References

External links
 Official website

2013 animated films
Indian animated fantasy films
2013 films
Films based on Sinbad the Sailor
2013 fantasy films